The Honda CMX500 Rebel (also called as Honda CMX500 or Honda Rebel 500) is a motorcycle made by Japanese company Honda. The model was presented in November 2016 in Long Beach, California, and is being sold since spring 2017. Model year 2020 gets an LED lighting package new instruments, and a slipper/assist clutch that lightens clutch pull.

It combines a fresh, blacked-out look with features like a low seat height, light weight and its narrow 471cc parallel-twin engine with plenty of user-friendly power.

The riding position, chassis and fat tyres also contribute to its comfort, practicality and ease of everyday use. The seat is a low 690mm from the deck.

Specifications

Engine

Concept 
The development was described to, according to President of Astra Honda Motor Toshiyuki Inuma, as "simple" and "raw". Modern lines with stylistic elements of the 20th century intended to shape the motorcycle. The modification or customization was in the foreground. Through minimalism, changing should be easier to access and also enhance individuality.

The responsible Honda chief designer Keita Mikura describes the underlying concept as follows: 

As a mixture of retro-look and modernity, the exterior components are kept in a classic and minimalist form, and the technical components behind them are implemented according to modernity.

References 

CMX500
Cruiser motorcycles
Motorcycles introduced in 2016
Motorcycles powered by straight-twin engines